The largest employers in the world include companies, militaries, and governments.

Largest employers 

Companies and institutions are included in this list.

Largest private and semiprivate employers
The rankings below are the six private-sector and semiprivate companies providing the most jobs worldwide, according to a list published in 2021 by Fortune magazine. The Tata Group of companies, which collectively employ over 720,000 people, is not listed by Fortune as a single enterprise.

See also

 Fortune Global 500
 Forbes Global 2000
 List of multinational corporations
 List of largest European manufacturing companies by revenue
 List of largest financial services companies by revenue
 List of the largest software companies
 List of largest Internet companies
 List of largest technology companies by revenue
 List of private-equity firms
 List of largest companies by revenue
 List of public corporations by market capitalization
 List of largest corporate profits and losses
 Lists of occupations
 List of types of tradesman
 Lists of companies – company-related list articles on Wikipedia
 List of largest United States–based employers globally
 List of wealthiest organizations

References

External links
 Fortune Global 500

Employees
Economy-related lists of superlatives
Employers